Edward Clarke (1 October 1888 – 16 May 1982) was a British modern pentathlete. He competed at the 1920 Summer Olympics.

References

External links
 

1888 births
1982 deaths
British male modern pentathletes
Olympic modern pentathletes of Great Britain
Modern pentathletes at the 1920 Summer Olympics